Gioacchino Vitagliano (1669 – 27 April 1739) was a Sicilian Baroque sculptor. He was born and died in Palermo.

He trained under Giacomo Serpotta, and married Serpotta's daughter. He sculpted the Fontana del Garraffo in Palermo. He also created reliefs and sculptures for the Church of the Gesu and the Chapel of the Rosary in the church of Santa Cita.

References

1669 births
1739 deaths
Italian Baroque sculptors
Sicilian Baroque
17th-century Italian sculptors
Italian male sculptors
18th-century Italian sculptors
Artists from Palermo
18th-century Italian male artists